The Korean Hip-hop Awards (KHA; Hangul: 한국 힙합 어워즈) is an annual South Korean music awards ceremony. It was first held in 2017 and is hosted by the hip hop web magazines Hiphople and Hiphopplaya. The winners are decided by 50% critic vote and 50% netizen vote.

Winners and nominees

Artist of the Year

New Artist of the Year

Hip Hop Album of the Year

Hip Hop Track of the Year

R&B Album of the Year

R&B Track of the Year

Producer of the Year

Collaboration of the Year

Underrated Album of the Year

Music Video of the Year

Label of the Year

Notes

References

 2017 Winners: 

 2018 Winners: 

 2019 Winners: 

 2020 Winners: 

 2021 Winners: 
 2022 Winners: 
 2023 Winners: 

Awards established in 2017
Hip hop awards
South Korean music awards